The 2021 Patriot League Football Championship Game was a college football game played on Saturday April 17, 2021, to determine the 2020–21 champion of the Patriot League. The game featured the south division champions Bucknell Bison and the North division champions Holy Cross Crusaders in the conference's first championship game. The game was held because the Patriot League split into two divisions for the first time in its history, after the Georgetown Hoyas opted out of the 2021 spring football season.

Teams
The game was played between the Holy Cross Crusaders and the Bucknell Bison. This was the 37th overall meeting between the programs; Holy Cross entered the game leading the all-time series, 23-13.

Holy Cross Crusaders

Holy Cross entered the game with a 2-0 record. They finished first in the north division of the Patriot League. Holy Cross had been the Patriot League champions 7 times prior in 1986, 1987, 1989, 1990, 1991, 2009, 2019.

Bucknell Bison

Bucknell entered the game with a 2-1 record. They finished first in the south division of the Patriot League. Bucknell has only won the Patriot League championship once, in 1996.

Game summary

References

Championship Game
Patriot League Football Championship Game
Bucknell Bison football games
Holy Cross Crusaders football games
Patriot League Football Championship Game
Patriot League Football Championship Game